Cloonagh Lough is a freshwater lake in the west of Ireland. It is located in west County Roscommon in the catchment of the Boyle River.

Geography and natural history
The north shore of the lake is part of the Derrinea Bog Special Area of Conservation.

See also
List of loughs in Ireland

References

Cloonagh